The men's team sprint at the 2008 Summer Olympics took place on August 15 at the Laoshan Velodrome.

After delivering three superb rides in the process, British trio Chris Hoy, Jason Kenny, and Jamie Staff defeated France by a 0.523-second margin to dominate the team sprint final with a gold-medal time in 43.128. The French threesome of Grégory Baugé, Kévin Sireau, and Arnaud Tournant took home the silver in 43.651, while Germany's René Enders, Maximilian Levy, and Stefan Nimke edged out the Aussies by eight hundredths of a second for the bronze in 44.014.

Competition format

A men's team sprint race consists of a three-lap race between two teams of three cyclists, starting on opposite sides of the track.  Each member of the team must lead for one of the laps.

The tournament consisted of an initial qualifying round.  The top eight teams advanced to the first round.  The first round comprised head-to-head races based on seeding (1st vs. 8th, 2nd vs. 7th, etc.). The winners of those four heats advanced to the medal round, with the two fastest winners competing in the gold medal final and the two slower winners facing off for bronze.

Schedule 
All times are China standard time (UTC+8).

Results

Qualification

First round

Medal round
Bronze medal final

 Gold medal final

References

External links
 NBC Olympics: Cycling

Track cycling at the 2008 Summer Olympics
Cycling at the Summer Olympics – Men's team sprint
Men's events at the 2008 Summer Olympics